Gari is a rural locality (a village) in Dobryansky District, Perm Krai, Russia. The population was 221 as of 2010. There are 26 streets.

References 

Rural localities in Dobryansky District